Ittihad Khemisset is a Moroccan football club based in Khemisset.
The club was founded in 1940.  They play their home games at Stade du 18 novembre.

Honours

Moroccan League First Division: 0

Second place : 2008

Coupe du Trône: 0

Runner-up : 1973

GNF 2 Moroccan Championship: 0
Second place : 2000

Performance in CAF competitions
CAF Confederation Cup: 1 appearance
2009 – 2nd Round of 16

Squad

Former managers
  Eugen Moldovan (2004–05)
  Hussein Amotta (2005–08)

Sport equipment
 Bang Sports

References

 
Association football clubs established in 1940
Football clubs in Morocco
1940 establishments in Morocco
Sports clubs in Morocco